Pile or Piles may refer to:

Architecture
 Pile, a type of deep foundation
 Screw piles, used for building deep foundations
 Pile bridge, structure that uses foundations consisting of long poles
 Pile lighthouse, a type of skeletal lighthouse, used primarily in Florida, US, and in Australia
 Screw-pile lighthouse, a lighthouse that stands on piles screwed into sandy or muddy sea or river bottoms

Energy
 Atomic pile, early term for a nuclear reactor, typically one constructed of graphite
 Charcoal pile, a structure from wood and turf for production of charcoal
 Voltaic pile, first modern electric battery

People
People with the name Pile:
 Pile (surname)
 Pile (singer) (born 1988), Japanese voice actress and singer, born Eriko Hori

People with the name Piles:
 Roger de Piles (1636–1709), French art theorist
 Samuel H. Piles (1858–1940), American politician, attorney, and diplomat
 Gerasim Pileš (1913–2003), Soviet Chuvash writer, playwright, sculptor, and painter

Places

Europe
 Piles, Valencia, a commune in the province of Valence, in Spain
 Cinq-Mars-la-Pile, a commune of Indre-et-Loire, in the central region of France
 Les Piles, a commune in the comarca of Conca de Barberà, in the province of Tarragona, in Spain
 Port-de-Piles, a commune in Centre-West in France
 Windscale Piles, a former pair of nuclear reactors in Cumberland, England

North America
 Grandes-Piles, Quebec, municipality in Mékinac Regional County Municipality, in Mauricie, Québec, Canada
 Saint-Jean-des-Piles, Quebec, a past municipality and a sector of Shawinigan City in Québec, Canada
 Piles Creek, a stream in Union County, New Jersey, United States
 The Chicago Pile-1, the world's first artificial nuclear fission reactor
 The Pile, a common nickname for the ruins of the World Trade Center site, following the 11 September 2001 attacks

Other uses
 Pile (abstract data type)
 Pile (band), an American indie rock band
 Pile (heraldry), an ordinary in heraldry, a downward-pointing triangle
 Pile (textile), fabric with raised surface made of upright loops or strands of yarn
 Carpet pile
 "Piles", a common name for hemorrhoids
 Rubble pile, in astronomy, an object consisting of individual pieces of rock that have coalesced under gravity
 The Pile (dataset), a machine learning dataset

See also
 Piling (disambiguation)
 Heap (disambiguation)
 Pilae stacks
 Pyle (surname)
 Pyles (surname)